The United States Department of the Navy Police is the uniformed law enforcement branch of the United States Navy. It provides professional, civilian, federal police officers, to serve and protect U.S. Navy personnel and installations.

It works alongside the active duty personnel of the U.S. Navy Master-at-Arms, the military police of the U.S. Navy.

Duties

The DON Police carry out the following duties:

law enforcement, 
force protection, 
physical security
and antiterrorism missions.

See also

Military criminal investigative organizations
 Defense Criminal Investigative Service (DCIS)
 United States Air Force Office of Special Investigations (AFOSI or OSI)
 United States Army Counterintelligence (ACI)
 United States Army Criminal Investigation Division (USACID or CID)
 Naval Criminal Investigative Service (NCIS)
 United States Marine Corps Criminal Investigation Division (USMCCID)
 Coast Guard Investigative Service (CGIS)

Federal law enforcement
 List of United States federal law enforcement agencies
 Master-at-arms (United States Navy)
 Shore Patrol (USN and USMC)
 Criminal Investigation Task Force (CITF)
 Military police
 Department of Defense Police
 Department of the Army Civilian Police
 Department of the Air Force Police
 United States Marine Corps Civilian Police
 United States Coast Guard Police
 National Oceanic and Atmospheric Administration Fisheries Office of Law Enforcement (NOAA OLE)
 Special agent
 U.S. Coast Guard (USCG)
 U.S. Diplomatic Security Service (DSS), State Department

JAG Corps
 Judge Advocate General's Corps, U.S. Navy
 U.S. Marine Corps Judge Advocate Division

Intelligence
 Marine Corps Intelligence Activity
 Marine Corps Counterintelligence
 Office of Naval Intelligence (ONI)
 Coast Guard Intelligence (CGI)

References

United States Department of Defense agencies
Federal law enforcement agencies of the United States
United States Navy organization
United States Marine Corps organization
Civilian police forces of defense ministries
Agency-specific police departments of the United States
